Mats Åke Olsson (born 12 January 1960) is a Swedish retired handball goalkeeper, who is currently goalkeeping coach for Norway women's national handball team and Elverum Håndball. He was born in Malmö.

Player career
Olsson played 294 caps for Sweden between 1979 and 1997. He competed at 4 summer olympics and 6 World championships. Mats Olsson started his career at Dalhems IF in Malmö. After that he played for LUGI HF, one of the most prominent Swedish clubs at the time.

As a professional player he represented Caja Cantabria in the Spanish elite league.

Olympics
In 1984, he was a member of the Swedish handball team which finished fifth in the Olympic tournament. He played three matches.

Four years later he was part of the Swedish team which finished fifth again in the Olympic tournament of the 1988 Olympics. He played all six matches.

At the 1992 Games he won the silver medal with the Swedish team. He played all seven matches.

His last Olympic appearance was at the Atlanta Games in 1996 when he won his second silver medal with the Swedish team. He played six matches.

Coaching career
After his professional retirement he switched to a civilian career in the private sector before, once again, returning to Caja Cantabria, this time as general manager for the club.

In 2005, Olsson became manager for the Portugal men's national handball team. The same year he signed a three-year deal with the Norwegian handball association, as a head coach for the Norwegian women's goalkeepers.

On 14 January 2018, Olsson was appointed as a member of the Commission of Coaching and Methods of International Handball Federation by the IHF Council in its meeting held in Zagreb (Croatia) on the fringes of the 2018 European Men's Handball Championship.

He's been the goalkeeping coach for Swedish men's national handball team between 2014 and 2021. As of 2021 he is still goalkeeping coach for the Norwegian women's national team, and for Elverum Håndball.

Player clubs
 Dalhems IF
 LUGI HF
 GD Teka
 Ystads IF
 Caja Cantabria

Coaching teams
 Caja Cantabria
 Portugal men's national handball team
 Norway women's national handball team
 Sweden men's national handball team
 Elverum Håndball

Resume
 Caps/Goals: 294/2 (1979–1997)
 World champion 1990 (in Prague, Czechoslovakia)
 European champion 1994
 World champion runner up 1997, in Kumamoto, Japan
 Twice olympic silver medalist: Barcelona (1992) and Atlanta (1996)
 3rd place in the 1993 and 1995 World championships
 Participated in four Summer Olympics: Los Angeles (1984), Seoul (1988), Barcelona (1992) and Atlanta (1996)

External links
profile

1960 births
Living people
Swedish male handball players
Liga ASOBAL players
Olympic handball players of Sweden
Handball players at the 1984 Summer Olympics
Handball players at the 1988 Summer Olympics
Handball players at the 1992 Summer Olympics
Handball players at the 1996 Summer Olympics
Olympic silver medalists for Sweden
Swedish expatriate sportspeople in Spain
Handball coaches of international teams
Olympic medalists in handball
Lugi HF players
Medalists at the 1996 Summer Olympics
Medalists at the 1992 Summer Olympics
Sportspeople from Malmö